Edmund John Chisholm Dwyer-Gray (2 April 18706 December 1945) was an Irish-Australian politician, who was the 29th Premier of Tasmania from 11 June to 18 December 1939. He was a member of the Australian Labor Party (ALP).

Early life
He was born Edmund John Chisholm Dwyer Gray on 2 April 1870 in Dublin, Ireland, the son of Edmund Dwyer Gray, an MP in the British House of Commons and Caroline Agnes Gray. He was the maternal grandson of Caroline Chisholm, the English humanitarian renowned for her social welfare work with female immigrants to Australia. His paternal grandfather was Sir John Gray, the Irish Member of Parliament for Kilkenny City in the House of Commons, and an associate of the Irish nationalist Daniel O'Connell. He was educated at the Benedictine monastery at Fort Augustus, Scotland, and at Clongowes Wood College, a Jesuit school in County Kildare.

Newspaper editorship and emigration to Australia
Gray first visited Australia in 1887, as he was suffering from rheumatism and hoped the climate might improve his health. He returned to Ireland shortly afterwards and joined the editorial committee of the Freeman's Journal, a nationalist newspaper of which his father and grandfather had been proprietors.

Between visits to Australia where he met and married his wife Clara, Gray continued to work on the Freeman's Journal which became involved in the Irish political scandal and leadership crisis when Charles Stewart Parnell married a divorced woman. Despite his family's support for Parnell, Gray altered the Journal'''s policy to compete with an anti-Parnell paper, causing some controversy and contributing to his decision to migrate to Australia permanently.

After some travel in Australia, New Zealand and Fiji where he was involved with some mining ventures, Gray spent ten years working as a farmer in New Norfolk, but by 1912 was in Hobart editing the Daily Post, an Australian Labor Party newspaper. When the paper was taken over by the Australian Workers' Union, Gray moved to Sydney, where he worked for Jack Lang briefly, before returning to Hobart to edit an ALP/ACTU newspaper called the People's Voice (later Voice), established by him in 1925 and continuing under his editorship until his death in 1945.

Tasmanian politics

Gray unsuccessfully stood for the Tasmanian Legislative Council in 1915. At the 1928 state election, he hyphenated his name to Dwyer-Gray, so that he would be placed alphabetically at the top of the ballot paper thereby capturing the donkey vote. It may have worked—Dwyer-Gray was elected to the House of Assembly, representing the electorate of Denison for the Labor Party. He became deputy leader of the party in 1932, under Albert Ogilvie, and when Ogilvie won the 1934 state election, Dwyer-Gray became Treasurer and Deputy Premier in Ogilvie's cabinet.

As both Treasurer and editor of  Voice, Dwyer-Gray was a proponent of the social credit concept pioneered by C. H. Douglas. He had visited New Zealand, which he saw as an ideal model and precedent for Tasmania's economy and society—a "worker's paradise" as he referred to it—should the Douglasite concept of national credit be adopted.

Albert Ogilvie died of a heart attack in office on 10 June 1939, and on 6 July Dwyer-Gray was elected as leader of the ALP, and hence officially became Premier of Tasmania, although only for six months due to an arrangement with fellow MHA Robert Cosgrove that he would stand aside for Cosgrove to assume the premiership in December 1939.

Later life and legacy
In 1940, he wrote an article in Voice praising Adelaide herbalist and healer Mahomet Allum, calling him a "better Christian than most Christians".

Dwyer-Gray died in Hobart on 6 December 1945, survived by his wife, who died in 1947.

Although his ideas were radical for the time, Dwyer-Gray's insistent lobbying of Tasmanian-born Prime Minister Joseph Lyons to permanently solve the funding problem for small states like Tasmania enabled him as treasurer to bring post-Depression financial security to the state. While criticising Lyons' establishment of the Commonwealth Grants Commission in The Voice'', Dwyer-Gray nonetheless gained favourable treatment for Tasmania, "bringing home the bacon" that allowed Cosgrove to fund public health, the public service and hydroelectric development.

References

External links
 

1870 births
1945 deaths
19th-century Irish people
Irish newspaper editors
Edmund
Australian newspaper editors
Irish emigrants to Australia (before 1923)
People educated at Clongowes Wood College
Politicians from Dublin (city)
Politicians from Hobart
Members of the Tasmanian House of Assembly
Premiers of Tasmania
Treasurers of Tasmania
Australian Labor Party members of the Parliament of Tasmania
Australian social crediters